Theobald mac Uilleag Bourke, 14th Mac William Íochtar (died 1537) was an Irish chieftain and noble.

Theobald was the son of Uilleag de Búrca and grandson of Edmund na Féasóige de Búrca, 4th Mac William Íochtar (d.1458). His brother, Edmond de Búrca, 12th Mac William Íochtar (d.1527), had been succeeded by a cousin, Seaán an Tearmainn Bourke, 13th Mac William Íochtar (the son of Ricard Bourke, 9th Mac William Íochtar), before Theobald became chieftain. Theobald was succeeded by his brother Edmond's son, David de Búrca, 15th Mac William Íochtar.

Genealogy

 Sir Edmond Albanach de Burgh (d. 1375),  1st Mac William Íochtar (Lower Mac William), (Mayo)
 William de Burgh (d.1368)
 Thomas mac Edmond Albanach de Burca, 1375–1402, 2nd Mac William Íochtar
 Walter mac Thomas de Burca (d.1440), 3rd Mac William Íochtar
 Theobald Bourke (d.1503), 8th Mac William Íochtar
 Meiler Bourke (d.1520), 11th Mac William Íochtar
 Ricard Bourke (d.1509), 9th Mac William Íochtar
 Seaán an Tearmainn Bourke (alive 1527), 13th Mac William Íochtar
 Ricard mac Seaán an Tearmainn Bourke (d.1571), 16th Mac William Íochtar
 Edmund na Féasóige de Burca, (d.1458), 4th Mac William Íochtar
 Ricard Ó Cuairsge Bourke (d.1473), 7th Mac William Íochtar
 Edmond de Burca (d.1527), 10th Mac William Íochtar
 Walter de Burca
 Seaán de Burca
 Oliver de Burca
 Seaán mac Oliver Bourke (d.1580), 17th Mac William Íochtar
 Richard Bourke (d.1586), 19th Mac William Íochtar
 Walter Ciotach de Burca of Belleek (d.1590)
 Tibbot (Theobald) MacWalter Kittagh Bourke, 21st Mac William Íochtar, 1st Marquess of Mayo
 Walter (Balthasar) Bourke, 2nd Marquess of Mayo
 Thomas Ruadh de Burca
 Uilleag de Burca
 Edmond de Burca (d.1527), 12th Mac William Íochtar
 David de Burca (alive 1537), 15th Mac William Íochtar
 Richard the Iron Bourke (d.1583), 18th Mac William Íochtar
 Tibbot (Theobald) ne Long Bourke (1567-1629), 23rd Mac William Íochtar, 1st Viscount Mayo (1627)
 Viscounts Mayo
 William "the Blind Abbot" Bourke (d.1593), 20th Mac William Íochtar
 Theobald mac Uilleag Bourke (d.1537), 14th Mac William Íochtar
 Risdeárd de Burca
 Ricard Deamhan an Chorráin de Burca
 Risdeárd Mac Deamhan an Chorráin (Richard) "the Devils Hook" Bourke (d.1601), 22nd Mac William Íochtar
 Seaán de Burca (d.1456)
 Tomás Óg de Burca, (d.1460), 5th Mac William Íochtar
 Risdeárd de Burca (d.1473), 6th Mac William Íochtar

Annalistic references

References

Further reading
 The History of Mayo, Hubert T. Knox, 1908
 Lower Mac William and Viscounts of Mayo, 1332-1649, in A New History of Ireland IX, pp. 235–36, Oxford, 1984 (reprinted 2002).

External links
 http://www.ucc.ie/celt/published/T100005D/

People from County Mayo
16th-century Irish people
Theobald mac Uilleag
1537 deaths
Year of birth unknown